St Mary's Hospital in the Phoenix Park, Dublin  offers stroke rehabilitation to patients of all ages, provides in patients rehabilitation to older population and provides residential care to older persons.
It's a multidisciplinary community hospital with access to array of skilled professionals in the care of older persons.
It also provides out patient services via the Day hospital.

History

Royal Hibernian Military School
The Royal Hibernian Military School was founded in 1769 as the Hibernian Asylum, by the Hibernian Society, a philanthropic organisation founded in Ireland in 1769 after the Seven Years' War. The Society petitioned the King for a charter on 18 April 1769 and the Hibernian Society was incorporated under Royal Charter on 15 July 1769. The first meeting of the Governors was held on 6 November 1769 in Dublin Castle.

In 1922 the school and boys moved to Shorncliffe and the buildings were handed over to the newly independent Irish Government.

Medical use
The buildings were used as a hospital by the Irish Army. In 1948 it was transferred to the Dublin Health Authority and turned into a Chest Hospital. In 1964 it became a facility for older patients and provides today accommodation for dependent older people. St Mary’s Hospital undertook a major renovation in late 2020 bringing facilities to that of a modern health care facility. St Mary’s Hospital has increased it inpatient capacity from 48 to 101 sub-acute rehabilitation beds providing support to acute hospitals in the region.
Phase 2 of the infrastructure upgrade is to include expansion and modernisation of the hospitals x-Ray department. The Phoenix Park Community Nursing Unit (PPCNU) has 150 beds and provides residential care to older adults.

COVID-19 pandemic
During the 2020 COVID-19 pandemic patients contracted COVID-19. On 11 April 2020 it was announced by HSE that 11 patients had died in the hospital since 2 April 2020. Ten patients were confirmed as testing positive for COVID-19 and the eleventh was a suspected COVID-19 case that was awaiting confirmation. On 25 April 2020 HSE confirmed that 21 patients had died at the hospital since the start of April. Eleven residents had died between 2 April and 17 April and a further ten had died between 17 April and 25 April. All who died tested positive for COVID-19.

References

1769 establishments in Ireland
Health Service Executive hospitals
Teaching hospitals in Dublin (city)
Former military buildings and structures
Phoenix Park